The tropical mabuya  (Trachylepis polytropis) is a species of skink found in Africa.

References

Trachylepis
Reptiles described in 1903
Taxa named by George Albert Boulenger